Pepan Dam  is a rockfill dam located in Hokkaido Prefecture in Japan. The dam is used for irrigation. The catchment area of the dam is 32 km2. The dam impounds about 27  ha of land when full and can store 3800 thousand cubic meters of water. The construction of the dam was started on 1973 and completed in 1997.

References

Dams in Hokkaido